The following is the 1967–68 network television schedule for the three major English language commercial broadcast networks in the United States. The schedule covers primetime hours from September 1967 through August 1968. The schedule is followed by a list per network of returning series, new series, and series cancelled after the 1966–67 season.

New fall series are highlighted in bold.

Each of the 30 highest-rated shows is listed with its rank and rating as determined by Nielsen Media Research.

National Educational Television (NET), the network predecessor to PBS, introduced its first live, in-pattern weekly series in November, 1967, PBL (an acronym for Public Broadcast Laboratory), which was cleared in a simultaneous 8:30pm ET/5:30pm PT Sunday time-slot on the majority of NET stations. In the first season the series offered usually two-hour episodes, in the second season (1968–69) episodes usually ran for 90 minutes, after a 150-minute premiere on November 5, 1967. The series was a mix of filmed segments and live interviews, discussion panels and other performance.

 Yellow indicates the programs in the top 10 for the season.
 Cyan indicates the programs in the top 20 for the season.
 Magenta indicates the programs in the top 30 for the season.

Sunday 

NOTE: On NBC, Animal Kingdom — renamed Animal World beginning with its August 11, 1968, broadcast — aired from 6:30 to 7:00 p.m. from June 16, 1968, to September 1968.

Monday

Tuesday

Wednesday 

Note: CBS decided in September to replace Dundee and the Culhane in December with The Jonathan Winters Show. The Avengers replaced Custer in January 1968.

Thursday 

Note: Good Company, an interview show hosted by F. Lee Bailey, did so poorly in the Nielsen ratings that ABC decided not to bother replacing it, temporarily returning its time period to their affiliates.

Friday

Saturday

By network

ABC

Returning Series
ABC Scope
The ABC Sunday Night Movie
The ABC Wednesday Night Movie
The Avengers
Batman
Bewitched
The Big Valley
The Dating Game
The F.B.I.
Felony Squad
The Hollywood Palace
The Invaders
Iron Horse
The King Family Show
The Lawrence Welk Show
The Newlywed Game
Peyton Place
The Rat Patrol
Saga of Western Man
That Girl
Voyage to the Bottom of the Sea

New Series
Cowboy in Africa
Custer
Dream House *
The Flying Nun
Garrison's Gorillas
Good Company
The Guns of Will Sonnett
Hondo
It Takes a Thief *
Judd, for the Defense
Man in a Suitcase
N.Y.P.D.
Off to See the Wizard
Operation: Entertainment *
The Second Hundred Years

Not returning from 1966–67:
12 O'Clock High
ABC Stage 67
Combat!
F Troop
The Fugitive
The Green Hornet
Hawk
Love on a Rooftop
Malibu U
The Man Who Never Was
The Monroes
The Picadilly Palace
The Pruitts of Southampton
Rango
The Rounders 
Shane
The Tammy Grimes Show
The Time Tunnel

CBS

Returning Series
The 21st Century
The Andy Griffith Show
The Beverly Hillbillies
CBS News Hour
CBS Playhouse
CBS Reports
CBS Thursday Night Movie
The CBS Friday Night Movies
Daktari
The Ed Sullivan Show
Family Affair
Gomer Pyle, U.S.M.C.
Green Acres
Gunsmoke
Hogan's Heroes
The Jackie Gleason Show
Lassie
Lost in Space
The Lucy Show
Mission: Impossible
My Three Sons
Petticoat Junction
The Red Skelton Show
The Smothers Brothers Comedy Hour
The Smothers Brothers Summer Show
The Wild Wild West

New Series
The Carol Burnett Show
Cimarron Strip
Dundee and the Culhane
Gentle Ben
Good Morning World
He & She
The Jonathan Winters Show *
Mannix
Premiere *
The Prisoner

Not returning from 1966–67:
Away We Go
Coliseum
Coronet Blue
The Danny Kaye Show
The Garry Moore Show
Gilligan's Island
I've Got a Secret
It's About Time
The Jean Arthur Show
Jericho
Mr. Terrific
Our Place
Pistols 'n' Petticoats
Run, Buddy, Run
To Tell the Truth
Vacation Playhouse
What's My Line?

NBC

Returning Series
Actuality Specials
American Profile
The Andy Williams Show
Animal World
The Bell Telephone Hour
Bonanza
Daniel Boone
The Dean Martin Show
Dragnet 1968
Get Smart
I Dream of Jeannie
I Spy
The Man from U.N.C.L.E.
The Monkees
NBC News Reports
NBC Tuesday Night at the Movies
NBC Saturday Night at the Movies
Run for Your Life
The Saint
Star Trek
Tarzan
The Virginian
Wild Kingdom
Walt Disney's Wonderful World of Color

New Series
Accidental Family
Adam-12
AFL Football
The Champions
Dean Martin Presents the Golddiggers
The High Chaparral
Hollywood Squares *
Ironside
The Jerry Lewis Show
Kraft Music Hall
Maya
The Mothers-in-Law
Rowan and Martin's Laugh-In *
The Sammy Davis Jr. Show *

Not returning from 1966–67:
Animal Secrets
Bob Hope Presents the Chrysler Theatre
Captain Nice
Dean Martin Summer Show Starring Your Host Vic Damone
The Girl from U.N.C.L.E.
The Hero
Hey, Landlord
Laredo
Occasional Wife
Please Don't Eat the Daisies
The Road West
The Roger Miller Show
T.H.E. Cat

Note: The * indicates that the program was introduced in midseason.

References

Additional sources
 Castleman, H. & Podrazik, W. (1982). Watching TV: Four Decades of American Television. New York: McGraw-Hill. 314 pp.
 McNeil, Alex. Total Television. Fourth edition. New York: Penguin Books. .
 Brooks, Tim & Marsh, Earle (1964). The Complete Directory to Prime Time Network TV Shows (3rd ed.). New York: Ballantine. .

United States primetime network television schedules
1967 in American television
1968 in American television